Torsten Reinhold "Tom" Anderson (né Andersson, 9 February 1904 – 19 December 1986) was a New Zealand wrestler who represented his country at the 1938 British Empire Games.

Biography
Born in Sollefteå, Sweden, on 9 February 1904, Anderson was the son of Johan Reinhold Andersson and Fanny Sofia Hägglund.

Anderson began wrestling in 1925 when he met Anton Koolmann at the latter's newly established wrestling school in Sydney, Australia. The pair would later reconnect in Wellington after both had moved to New Zealand.

Anderson became a naturalised New Zealand citizen on 12 January 1938, less than a month before the 1938 British Empire Games in Sydney. At those games, he competed in the freestyle wrestling light-heavyweight (90 kg) division, finishing in fourth place.

Anderson died on 19 December 1986, and he was buried at Memorial Park Cemetery, Christchurch.

References

1904 births
1986 deaths
People from Sollefteå Municipality
Swedish emigrants to New Zealand
Naturalised citizens of New Zealand
Commonwealth Games competitors for New Zealand
Wrestlers at the 1938 British Empire Games
New Zealand male sport wrestlers
Burials at Memorial Park Cemetery, Christchurch